The Many Adventures of Winnie the Pooh is a 1977 American animated musical anthology comedy film produced by Walt Disney Productions and distributed by Buena Vista Distribution. It is the 22nd Disney animated feature film and was first released on a double bill with The Littlest Horse Thieves on March 11, 1977.

Its characters have spawned a franchise of various sequels and television programs, clothing, books, toys, and an attraction of the same name at Disneyland,  Walt Disney World, and Hong Kong Disneyland in addition to Pooh's Hunny Hunt in Tokyo Disneyland.

Plot
The film joins together three previously released Winnie-the-Pooh animated featurettes based on the  original A. A. Milne sources, with extra bridging material to link the three stories into a larger tale: Winnie the Pooh and the Honey Tree (1966), Winnie the Pooh and the Blustery Day (1968), and Winnie the Pooh and Tigger Too (1974).

A short scene was added to bring the film to a close; originally made during the production of Blustery Day (based on the presence of Jon Walmsley as Christopher Robin), and based on the final chapter of The House at Pooh Corner, Christopher Robin must leave behind the Hundred Acre Wood to start school. The Narrator concludes that wherever Christopher Robin goes, Pooh will always be waiting.

Later featurette
Six years after the release of The Many Adventures of Winnie the Pooh, Disney commissioned a fourth featurette based on the stories. Winnie the Pooh and a Day for Eeyore premiered in theaters on March 11, 1983, but was not originally connected to the preceding films in any manner. It has since been added to home video releases of The Many Adventures of Winnie the Pooh.

Voice cast
 Sterling Holloway as Winnie the Pooh
 Bruce Reitherman, Jon Walmsley and Timothy Turner as Christopher Robin
 John Fiedler as Piglet
 Ralph Wright as Eeyore
 Clint Howard and Dori Whitaker as Roo
 Barbara Luddy as Kanga
 Paul Winchell as Tigger
 Junius Matthews as Rabbit
 Hal Smith as Owl
 Howard Morris as Gopher
 Sebastian Cabot as The Narrator

Production
The Many Adventures of Winnie the Pooh was the last film in the Disney canon in which Walt Disney had personal involvement, since one of the shorts (Winnie the Pooh and the Honey Tree) was released during his lifetime and he was involved in the production of Blustery Day. It was always Walt Disney's intention to create a feature film, but he decided to make shorts instead — after production had begun — to familiarize U.S. audiences with the characters. All three shorts, as well as future feature films, boast classic songs by the Sherman Brothers including "Winnie the Pooh" and "The Wonderful Thing About Tiggers".

The character Gopher, which does not appear in the Milne stories, was created because Disney wanted an all-American character that could appeal to the children, and also add an element of comedy.

For the character Piglet, hand gestures and other movements were used by the animators to create expressiveness, since he (and Pooh) had the appearance of dolls or stuffed animals with relatively simple button eyes. The scene where Rabbit deals with Pooh's rump being part of the "decor of his home" was not in the original book, but was reportedly contemplated by Disney when he first read the book.

Release

Reception
The website's critical consensus reads "Perhaps the most faithful of Disney's literary adaptations, this cute, charming collection of episodes captures the spirit of A.A. Milne's classic stories." Film critic Leonard Maltin called the original Pooh featurettes "gems"; he also noted that the artwork resembles the book illustrations and that the particular length of these featurettes meant that the filmmakers didn't have to "compress or protract their script."

Ruth Hill Viguers, however, when writing in A Critical History of Children’s Literature during the 1960s, mentioned Disney's Winnie the Pooh along with several other Disney adaptations as having "destroyed the integrity of the original books".

The film is recognized by American Film Institute in these lists:
 2008: AFI's 10 Top 10:
 Nominated Animation Film

Home media
The Many Adventures of Winnie the Pooh was first released on VHS, Betamax, CED videorecord, and laserdisc in the early 1980s. In 1996, it was re-released on VHS as part of the Walt Disney Masterpiece Collection series and included video footage of the making which was shown before the movie starts (as did the first UK VHS release in 1997). It was released on DVD for the first time in 2002 as a 25th Anniversary Edition, with digitally restored picture and sound. The individual shorts had also been released on their own on VHS in the 1990s.

The 25th-anniversary edition DVD includes, among other bonus features: "The Many Adventures of Winnie the Pooh: The Story Behind the Masterpiece", which documents the history of the books and their initial film adaptations; the short Winnie the Pooh and a Day for Eeyore (1983); and interviews with animators Ollie Johnston, Frank Thomas, and Burny Mattinson, as well as the Sherman Brothers, Paul Winchell, and others. Digital Media FX reviewer Shannon Muir stated that the audio and video quality of the film on this DVD was very high.

The "Friendship Edition" DVD was released on June 19, 2007. All of the special features from the previous "25th Anniversary Edition" DVD were recycled, with the only new addition being an episode of Playhouse Disney's computer-animated series My Friends Tigger & Pooh. The DVD re-release coincides with the 30th anniversary of the release of the film.

The Blu-ray version was released for the first time along with the third DVD release on August 27, 2013. The bonus features included a Mini Adventures of Winnie the Pooh segment, "Geniuses" and the only bonus feature that was kept from the previous DVD releases was the "Winnie the Pooh" theme song music video performed by Carly Simon.

Songs

References

External links

 
 
 
 

1977 films
1977 animated films
1970s American animated films
1970s children's animated films
1970s fantasy films
1970s musical comedy films
1970s English-language films
1970s buddy comedy films
American children's animated comedy films
American children's animated fantasy films
American films with live action and animation
American children's animated musical films
American comedy-drama films
American fantasy comedy-drama films
American musical comedy films
American musical drama films
American animated feature films
Animated buddy films
Animated films about animals
Animated films about friendship
Children's comedy-drama films
Films scored by Buddy Baker (composer)
Films directed by John Lounsbery
Films directed by Wolfgang Reitherman
Animated anthology films
Musicals by the Sherman Brothers
Walt Disney Animation Studios films
Walt Disney Pictures animated films
Winnie-the-Pooh films
Winnie the Pooh (franchise)
Films adapted into comics
Films adapted into television shows
1977 comedy films